Sorin Chifiriuc (born 1950, Bucharest, Romania) is a rock, new wave, and blues guitarist and vocalist.

Affectionately called Skifi by his fans, and a student of the Bucharest Music Conservatory (where he studied the violin, but which he did not graduate from), he is also known for his unconventional behaviour on stage.

He was a member of many well-known Romanian rock bands, such as Curtea Veche nr. 43, Sfinx, Iris, Domino, Roata, Electric Red Roosters, 2 Galbini.

After the Romanian Revolution of 1989, he worked for a while as a DJ for Radio Nova 22.

He spent his time between about 2004 and 2013 in a monastery in the Militari neighborhood of Bucharest, where he was known as Ierafim.

References

External links
Sorin Chifiriuc at Discogs
Interview with Sorin Chifiriuc

Romanian rock guitarists
Romanian rock bass guitarists
Musicians from Bucharest
1950 births
Living people